Bettarini is an Italian surname. Notable people with the surname include:

Cesare Bettarini (1901–1975), Italian actor
Rebecca Virginia Bettarini (born 1982), Italian businesswoman
Stefano Bettarini (born 1972), Italian footballer
Valentina Bettarini (born 1990), Italian ice hockey player

See also
7141 Bettarini, a main-belt asteroid

Italian-language surnames